Leaver or Leavers may refer to:

 Leaver, a supporter of Brexit
 Surname
 Brett Leaver (born 1970), New Zealand field hockey player 
 Charles Owen Leaver Riley (1854–1929), first Anglican archbishop of Perth, Western Australia
 Christopher Leaver (born 1937), British businessman who served as Sheriff and Lord Mayor of the City of London 
 Chris J. Leaver (born 1942), British biochemist
 Derek Leaver (1930–2013), English footballer
 Derek Leaver (chemist) (1929–1990), British scientist
 Don Leaver (1929–2015), British television producer
 Henrietta Leaver (1916–1993), Miss America in 1935
 Huggy Leaver (real name Hugh Leaver), British actor
 Jason Leaver Canadian creator of the Out with Dad LGBT web series
 Jimmy Leaver (born 1898), English professional footballer
 John Busuttil Leaver (born 1964), Maltese artist
 Marcus Leaver (born 1970), British publishing executive
 Noel Leaver (1889–1951), English painter and teacher
 Peter Leaver (born 1944), English barrister and football administrator
 Leavers machine, lacemaking machine invented by John Levers [sic] in 1813
 Leavers week or schoolies week, Australian high-school graduates' first week of holidays
 The Leavers, 2016 novel by Lisa Ko

See also
 Lever (disambiguation)
 Rudi Leavor (1926–2021) German-born British Jewish community leader
 Laver (disambiguation)